Huguenot Cemetery was created between 1710 and 1733 as a cemetery for the Huguenot inhabitants in the city of Cork. It is believed to be one of the last two surviving Huguenot graveyards in western Europe.

Cemetery
About 5,000 Huguenots came to Ireland during the time when they were fleeing religious persecution, following the revocation of the Edict of Nantes in their native France. Hundreds of these refugees settled in Cork. In the area of Lumley Street, now known as French Church Street, they built a school, an almshouse and a graveyard. The cemetery is home to the remains of some of the most prominent Huguenots of the city and it is understood that the remains of at least one former Lord Mayor of Cork are held within. The last recorded use of the graveyard for burial was in 1901. The cemetery is a recorded monument.

Further reading

References

External links
 

Huguenot cemeteries
National Monuments in County Cork